The A16 autoroute – also known as L'Européenne and forming between Abbeville and Dunkirk a part of the larger Autoroute des estuaires – is a motorway in northern France.

From its starting point near Paris, the A16 runs in a northerly direction, continues north parallel to the English Channel from Abbeville and then in an easterly direction along the North Sea coast. It is one of the two main routes between the Port of Calais/Channel Tunnel and Paris, the other being the A26 and  A1 route to the east.

The vast majority of the motorway was built in the 1990s to relieve the congested RN1 between Paris and the Côte d'Opale (Boulogne and Calais). An 8 km southern extension between l'Isle-Adam and Attainville to a junction with the Paris ringroad N104 (Francilienne) opened in 2020. Between Amblainville and Boulogne it is operated by the Société des Autoroutes du Nord et de l'Est de la France (SANEF) and is tolled. From Boulogne to the Belgian border the road is managed by the Direction Départementale de l'Équipement (DDE), which does not impose a toll.

This motorway does not have any officially designated "full" service areas – all of them are designated "Aire de Repos" (rest area).

List of junctions

Future extensions

Currently the A16 runs from junction number 8 to junction number 65. This leads to speculation that the southern end of the motorway is intended to be extended either directly south by upgrading the RD301/RN1 to meet the A1 at Saint-Denis, Seine-Saint-Denis, or to the east by upgrading the RN104 to meet the A1 at Paris-Charles De Gaulle, thus completing the missing junction numbers.

External links
 A16 autoroute in Saratlas
 Extension of the A16
 Extension of the A16
 Data on the A16
 CPDP PROJET A16

A16